The Sher-e-Bangla National Cricket Stadium, formerly known as the Mirpur Stadium, is a sports ground in Dhaka, the capital city of Bangladesh. The ground has hosted international cricket matches since 2006. It is named after A. K. Fazlul Huq, the first Prime Minister of Bengal, who was accorded the title Sher-e-Bangla ("The Tiger of Bengal"). The venue was taken over by the Bangladesh Cricket Board in 2004, replacing the Bangabandhu National Stadium as the home of both the men's and women's national teams. The first international match on the ground, a One Day International (ODI), was played between Bangladesh and Zimbabwe in 2006, with the first Test match played the following year between Bangladesh and India. The first Twenty20 International (T20I) match on the ground was played in 2011. Women's One Day International and Twenty20 International cricket has been played on the ground.

A five-wicket haul (also known as a "five-for" or "fifer") refers to a bowler taking five or more wickets in a single innings. This is regarded as a notable achievement.

The first bowler to take a five-wicket haul at Mirpur was Zaheer Khan for India against Bangladesh during the ground's debut Test match in May 2007. Bangladesh's Taijul Islam has returned the best Test bowling figures at the venue with eight wickets for 39 runs (8/39), followed by Mehedi Hasan and Zaheer Khan with figures of 7 for 58 and 7 for 87 respectively. , former Bangladesh captain Shakib Al Hasan has taken the most five-wicket hauls in Test matches on the ground with seven, followed by Hasan with five. Farhad Reza of Bangladesh was the first bowler to take a five-wicket haul at the ground in an ODI match, taking 5/42 against Ireland in March 2008.

West Indian Anisa Mohammed has taken the best bowling figures in an ODI on the ground, taking 7/16 in the final of the 2011 Women's Cricket World Cup Qualifier. Stuart Binny's six wickets for four runs for India in 2014 are the best ODI bowling figures on the ground by a man. South Africa's Kagiso Rabada took 6/16 on the ground in 2015 on his ODI debut. Rabada is one of four players to take a five-wicket haul during their ODI debut at the venue, the others being Bangladesh's Taskin Ahmed and Mustafizur Rahman and Jake Ball of England, making the Sher-e-Bangla National Cricket Stadium the only venue where four bowlers have achieved this feat. Rabada's figures of 6 for 16, are the best by a bowler on ODI debut and he is the second bowler to take a hat-trick on ODI debut. Two other players took hat-tricks as part of their ODI five-wicket hauls on this ground, Abdur Razzak against Zimbabwe in 2010, and Rubel Hossain against New Zealand in 2013. Two five-wicket hauls have been taken in Twenty20 International matches played on the ground. Shakib Al Hasan was the first player to achieve the feat at this ground during a T20I match, making him the only player to a take a five-wicket haul in all three international formats at the venue.

Key

Test match five-wicket hauls
A total of 39 five-wicket hauls have been taken in Test matches on the ground.

One Day International five-wicket hauls
A total of 19 five-wicket hauls have been taken in One Day International matches on the ground, 18 in men's matches and one in a woman's ODI.

Men's matches

Women's matches

Twenty20 International five-wicket hauls

Two five-wicket hauls have been taken in T20I matches on the ground.

Notes

See also
 Sher-e-Bangla National Cricket Stadium
 List of international cricket centuries at the Sher-e-Bangla National Cricket Stadium

References

External links
 International five-wicket hauls at Sher-e-Bangla National Cricket Stadium

Bangladeshi cricket lists
Lists of Bangladesh cricket records and statistics
Sher-e-Bangla National Cricket Stadium